Lac de Maury (also known as Lac de la Selves) is a lake in Aveyron, France. At an elevation of 590 m, its surface area is 1.66 km².

The Lac de Maury lies in the communes of Saint-Amans-des-Cots, Florentin-la-Capelle, Montpeyroux, Entraygues-sur-Truyère and Campouriez.

Maury